Patagopelta (meaning "Patagonian shield") is an extinct genus of nodosaurine dinosaur from the Late Cretaceous (upper Campanian–lower Maastrichtian) Allen Formation of Argentina. The genus contains a single species, P. cristata, known from a partial skeleton.

Discovery and naming 
The Patagopelta fossil material was found in sediments of the Allen Formation (Salitral Moreno locality) near General Roca, Río Negro Province, Argentina. This locality is dated to the upper Campanian to lower Maastrichtian ages of the Late Cretaceous period. The first remains were described in 1996 and often appeared in the literature as the "Argentinian ankylosaur". The fossil material consists of various osteoderms, a tooth, dorsal and caudal vertebrae, and femora. The Patagopelta holotype specimen, MPCA-SM-78, is represented by a cervical half-ring element.

New remains described in 2022 allowed Patagopelta cristata to be described as a new genus and species of nodosaurine dinosaurs by Facundo Riguetti, Xabier Pereda-Suberbiola, Denis Ponce, Leonardo Salgado, Sebastián Apesteguía, Sebastián Rozadilla, and Victoria Arbour. The generic name, "Patagopelta", is derived from "Patago", a reference to the discovery of the taxon in Argentinian Patagonia, and the Greek word "pelta", meaning "shield". The specific name, "cristata", means "crested" in Latin, referring to the large crests on its cervical osteoderms and femur.

Classification 
In their phylogenetic analyses, Riguetti et al. (2022) recovered Patagopelta as a member of the Nodosaurinae, within a clade of entirely North American nodosaurids from the middle of the Cretaceous period, in contrast to previous analyses that recovered it in the Panoplosaurini. In either case, it suggests that nodosaurids were part of a migration event of North American fauna into South America.

The cladogram below displays the results of their phylogenetic analyses.

Paleoecology
Patagopelta is known from the Late Cretaceous Allen Formation of Río Negro Province, Argentina. Many other dinosaurs, including titanosaurs (Aeolosaurus, Bonatitan, Menucocelsior, Panamericansaurus, Pellegrinisaurus, and Rocasaurus), hadrosaurids (Bonapartesaurus, Kelumapusaura, and Lapampasaurus), abelisaurids (Niebla and Quilmesaurus), dromaeosaurids (Austroraptor), and alvarezsaurids (Bonapartenykus), have been named from the formation. Birds (Lamarqueavis and Limenavis), pterosaurs (Aerotitan), rhynchocephalians (Lamarquesaurus), plesiosaurs (Kawanectes), and dryolestoid and gondwanathere mammals have also been described from the formation.

References 

Nodosaurids
Fossil taxa described in 2022
Late Cretaceous dinosaurs of South America
Fossils of Argentina
Allen Formation